A complex number is said to be hypertranscendental if it is not the value at an algebraic point of a function which is the solution of an algebraic differential equation with coefficients in Z[r] and with algebraic initial conditions.

The term was introduced by D. D. Morduhai-Boltovskoi in "Hypertranscendental numbers and hypertranscendental functions" (1949).

The term is related to transcendental numbers, which are numbers which are not a solution of a non-zero polynomial equation with rational coefficients. The number e is transcendental but not hypertranscendental, as it can be generated from the solution to the differential equation .

Any hypertranscendental number is also a transcendental number.

See also
 Hypertranscendental function

References 
 
 Hiroshi Umemura, "On a class of numbers generated by differential equations related with algebraic groups", Nagoya Math. Journal. Volume 133 (1994), 1-55. (Downloadable from ProjectEuclid)

Transcendental numbers